The Autostrada A8 is an Italian motorway which connects Milan to Varese. It was the first dual highway in the world and was opened 1924. This highway, while divided, contained only one lane in each direction and no interchanges.

See also 
 History of controlled-access highways

Buildings and structures completed in 1974
A08
Transport in Lombardy